The Macedonian Wikipedia is the Macedonian-language edition of Wikipedia, a free and publicly editable online encyclopedia.

Overview
This edition was started in September 2003 and has  articles,  active users,  administrators and two bureaucrats. It passed the 10,000 article mark in 2007. The Macedonian Wikipedia has been featured in some Macedonian newspapers, such as Nova Makedonija (English: New Macedonia) while the project itself has been featured in a number of domestic news agencies. It passed the 100,000 article mark on May 1, 2019, becoming the 62nd Wikipedia to surpass the 100,000 article mark.

Macedonian Wikipedia traffic analysis

See also 
Macedonian Encyclopedia

References

External links 

  Macedonian Wikipedia
  Macedonian Wikipedia mobile version

Wikipedias by language
Wikipedia
Macedonian encyclopedias
Internet properties established in 2003